Mohammad Zharmein Ashraf bin Ismail (born 30 March 2002) is a Malaysian professional footballer who plays as a winger for Malaysia Super League club Kedah Darul Aman.

Early life

Zharmein was born in Kampung Iboi Ulu, Sadong Jaya.

Club career

Sarawak United

Zharmein started his career with Sarawak United. He made 13 appearances for Sarawak United.

Kedah Darul Aman
On 21 December 2022, Zharmein signed a one-year contract with Malaysia Super League club Kedah Darul Aman.

International career

He has played for Malaysia youth national teams.

Style of play

Zharmein is left-footed and can operate as a winger os striker.

Career statistics

Club

References

External links
 

2002 births
Living people
People from Sarawak
Malaysian footballers
Association football forwards
Sarawak United FC players
Kedah Darul Aman F.C. players
Malaysia Super League players